The 1993–94 Serie C1 was the sixteenth edition of Serie C1, the third highest league in the Italian football league system.

A total of 36 teams contested the league, divided into two groups (in Italian: Gironi) of 18 teams. The season was characterized by a number of bankruptcies and scandals which altered the outcomes of the final league tables.

League tables

Group A

Promotion play-offs
Semifinals on 5 and 12 June 1994, finals on 19 June 1994.

Como promoted to Serie B.

Relegation play-offs
First legs on 5 June 1994, return legs on 12 June 2014.

Group B

Promotion play-offs
Semifinals on 5 and 12 June 1994, final on 22 June 1994.

Salernitana promoted to Serie B.

Relegation play-offs
First legs on 5 June 1994, return legs on 12 June 2014.

References

External links
Italy Championship 1993/94 at RSSSF

Serie C1 seasons
Italy
3